James Gerhard Eppard (born April 27, 1960) is a former Major League Baseball outfielder and first baseman.

Career
Drafted by the Oakland Athletics in the 13th round of the 1982 MLB amateur draft, Eppard made his Major League debut with the California Angels on September 8, 1987, and appeared in his final game on October 1, 1990.

Eppard became the Angels hitting coach in May 2012. On October 8, 2013, he was fired by the Angels.

References

External links

1960 births
Living people
Albany-Colonie A's players
American expatriate baseball players in Canada
Asheville Tourists managers
Baseball coaches from Indiana
Baseball players from Indiana
California Angels players
California Golden Bears baseball players
Edmonton Trappers players
Indianapolis Indians players
Los Angeles Angels of Anaheim coaches
Major League Baseball first basemen
Major League Baseball left fielders
Major League Baseball outfielders
Medford A's players
Modesto A's players
Salinas Spurs players
St. Paul Saints players
Syracuse Chiefs players
Tacoma Tigers players
Toronto Blue Jays players